Charles Whitmore may refer to:

 Charles Widmore, a fictional character on the American TV series Lost
 Charles Algernon Whitmore (1851–1908), British barrister and politician